Sawtooth is the debut album by British electronic musician Jonny L. The album was released on 17 November 1997 on CD and in a 5 × 10 box set.

Track listing 
Track listing is identical for both releases. 
 "Treading" – 5:35
 "Piper" – 5:59
 "S4" – 5:22
 "Wish U Had Something" – 6:24
 "Detroit" – 5:26 
 "Two of Us" – 6:25
 "Tychonic Cycle" – 6:48
 "Moving Thru Air" – 5:55
 "I Let U" – 5:06 
 "Obedience" – 6:41

Reception 
AllMusic gave the album 4/5 stars.

References 

1997 debut albums
Drum and bass albums